Ethiopia has a long history of taxing its population. , reforms have changed the way the tax system works in the nation; these reforms have aimed to centralize tax authority. Currently the nation's federal government lobbies many different types of taxes on its population; these taxes include income taxes on four main schedules, property taxes, and value added taxes (VAT).

History 
As one of the longest standing centralized independent nations in Africa, Ethiopia has a long history of levying taxes against its population. After the fall of the Emperor and the rise of the Derg government, much of the tax system was revamped under the new socialist system. In 1976, agricultural and rural land taxes were replaced by a land-use fee and a new agriculture tax. Ethiopia underwent major tax reform in the 1990s. As a result, the tax system was overhauled alongside much of the public finance system. The Ethiopian reforms were considered some of the most successful on the continent. Challenges abounded during the reforms, as Ethiopian law did not allow subnational governments to set their own tax rates, leading to an unwieldy tax system that required all decisions to be made from the federal level. Additional reforms were passed in 2002 as Ethiopia continued the shift to a market system⁠. These reforms included changes to outdated and ineffective trade and domestic tax law.

Categories of Taxation

Definitions of Income 
Ethiopia divides its types of income into four schedules: A, B, C, and D.

Schedule "A" - Taxation from employment.

Schedule "B" - Taxation from rent of land and buildings.

Schedule "C" - Taxation from taxation of income from business, professional and vocational occupations, lumbering, and interest.

Schedule "D" - Taxation from agricultural activities.

Value Added Tax (VAT) 
As of 2003, Ethiopia imposes a value added tax on all goods produced in the nation and all imported goods and services not exempt; the tax is rated at 15% on every transaction at each stage of manufacturing.

Stamp Duty 
Ethiopia imposes a stamp duty on legal documents in the country. Items taxed under Stamp Duty include: memorandum, bonds, contract agreements, security deeds, collective agreement, contract of employment, leases, notarial acts, power of attorney, and documents of title to property. Depending on the type of instrument the rates of Stamp Duty vary, ranging from flat rates to percentage of the valuations.

Other Taxes 
In addition to income taxes and value added tax, Ethiopia also imposes a multitude of other niche taxes. Fossil fuel and food taxes are levied, with certain studies claiming their effects are regressive.

Revenue 
As of 2019, Ethiopian tax revenue came in at 179 billion Birr. The majority of income comes from sales/VAT taxes on trade, goods and services, with business taxation coming in second.

Foreign Aid 
Ethiopia's tax revenue is three times as large as the amount it receives in foreign aid; studies have shown that "aid in Ethiopia positively affects tax revenues, particularly through technical assistance and policy advice rather than conditionality."

Distribution of Tax Revenues

Taxation Compliance 
As Ethiopia is a very large and diverse country, it faces issues implementing taxation. Only 57% of Ethiopian tax payers are considered "high" compliance taxpayers; high compliance is correlated with level of education, simplicity of tax preparation, and the view of government expenditures. The Ethiopian tax system has faced criticism for its perceived failures to redistribute income, and that taxation is not felt equally among income groups.

Business Taxation 
Small businesses in Ethiopia are taxed differently than individuals. Businesses are required to pay: "business income tax, windfall income tax, other income tax, turnover tax and excise tax." Over 20% of all tax revenue in Ethiopia is derived from business profit tax, and 62% of all direct taxes consist of business taxation. Tax burden in Ethiopia has been shown to fall unequally among firm sizes; a study from 2019 found that "small firms face the highest tax burden, the largest firms still pay more than middle‐sized firms do." While the tax rate for businesses is staggered through income thresholds, the effective tax rates for firms in Ethiopia range from over 25% for smaller businesses, down to below 10% for medium businesses, and 13% for large businesses.

References 

Taxation by country
Economy of Ethiopia